Crooked House is a British supernatural drama TV series which aired on BBC Four in December 2008.

The three-part series was broadcast on consecutive nights from 22 to 24 December 2008. It was written and co-produced by actor and writer Mark Gatiss, who found fame in the BBC series The League of Gentlemen. The three linked episodes form an anthology story, influenced by the writings of M. R. James and Amicus horror movies, and a Māori death-mask belonging to Gatiss. They concern the ghostly secrets of fictional Geap Manor, a recently demolished Tudor mansion.

The first story, "The Wainscoting", is set in the late 18th century. Gatiss plays a museum curator who is given a strange door-knocker, which inspires him to share his dark researches into the Manor. The first tale related the story of Joseph Bloxham, who buys and improves the Manor after capitalising on an investment which ruined his fellow speculators. Strange noises are heard behind the newly installed wainscoting, the wood of which came from the gallows known as 'Tyburn Tree'.

The second story, "Something Old", takes place in the 1920s, where, at the Manor, a lavish costume ball is being held. During the ball young Felix de Momery announces his engagement to Ruth, much to the surprise and annoyance of his grandmother and his friends, Billy and Katherine. The young couple's future seems to be inextricably linked with another tragic wedding day and a ghostly bride who haunts the corridors.

In the third episode, "The Knocker", Ben himself discovers that, even though demolished, Geap Manor continues to cast a long shadow. Recently split from his girlfriend, he finds the cosy blandness of his modern house suddenly altered by events from the distant past, and by the sinister figure of Sir Roger Widdowson.

The cast included Mark Gatiss, Julian Rhind-Tutt, Ian Hallard, Philip Jackson, Lee Ingleby, Jean Marsh, Samuel Barnett, Daniela Denby-Ashe, Anna Madeley, Andy Nyman, Jennifer Higham, and illusionist Derren Brown. The series was directed by Damon Thomas.

This is not to be confused with Agatha Christie’s murder mystery novel of the same name, which was adapted into a film in 2017 starring Glenn Close.

References

External links
 
 
Interview with Mark Gatiss at Digital Spy
Review at The Independent
Review at the Leicester Mercury

2008 British television series debuts
2008 British television series endings
2000s British drama television series
British supernatural television shows
BBC television dramas
2000s British television miniseries
British horror fiction television series
Television episodes written by Mark Gatiss
Television series by Endemol
Television series by Tiger Aspect Productions
English-language television shows
Television shows set in Berkshire
British fantasy television series
2000s British horror television series